Dar es Salaam Region (Mkoa wa Dar es Salaam in Swahili) is one of Tanzania's 31 administrative regions and is located in the east coast of the country. The region is comparable in size to the combined land and water areas of the nation state of Mauritius Dar es Salaam Region is bordered to the east by Indian Ocean and it is entirely surrounded by Pwani Region. The Pwani districts that border Dar es Salaam region are Bagamoyo District to the north, Kibaha Urban District to the west, Kisarawe District to the south west and Mkuranga District to the south of the region.
The region's seat (capital) is located inside the ward of Ilala. The region is named after the city of Dar es Salaam itself. The region is home to Tanzania's major finance, administration and industries, thus the making it the country's richest region. 
According to the 2022 census, the region has a total population of 5,383,728 and national census of 2012 had 4,364,541. The region has the highest population in Tanzania followed by Mwanza Region.

History

Geography
The city boasts a 100-kilometer shoreline that stretches from the mouth of the Mpiji River in the north to the mouth of the Mzinga River in the south. There are eight islands off the shore of the region. The climate in the city is a tropical coastal climate. Throughout the year, it is hot and humid, with an average temperature of 29 degrees C. The hottest months are October through March, when temperatures can reach 35 degrees C. Between May and August, temperatures hover around 25 degrees Celsius. There are two main rain seasons in the Region: a short rain season from October to December and a lengthy rain season from March to May. The average annual rainfall is 1000mm (lowest 800mm and highest 1300 mm). The city is separated into three ecological zones: upland, middle plateau, and lowlands. Coastal shrubs, Miombo forest, coastal marshes, and mangrove trees make up the majority of the natural vegetation.

Economy
Dar es Salaam is Tanzania's principal economic engine, serving as an administrative, industrial, fisheries, and commercial center (including mining trade). The city is home to over 40% of the country's total industrial manufacturing units and produces approximately 45 percent of Tanzania's gross industrial manufacturing output.
The city has a large harbor and is a major manufacturing center. Dar es Salaam attracts both formal and informal trade and transportation activity. After structural adjustment policies were implemented in 1985, service sector investment and civil service employment fell. Rising rates of unemployment and underemployment contributed to the expansion of the informal sector and informal settlements. 

According to the 2005 Property and Business Formalisation Programme, also referred to as Mkurabita, approximately 98 percent of enterprises are informal and operate outside of the legal system; in other words, the private sector is predominantly a part of the informal sector. Furthermore, it has been stated that approximately 89 percent of all property in Tanzania is owned outside of the legal system. Furthermore, they are not linked to formal domestic and international markets. Excessive and cumbersome restrictions prohibit Tanzanian small firms from transitioning from informal to formal activities. Tanzania's government has attempted measures to encourage the informal sector to enter the formal market, but these have generally failed.

Infrastructure
The Dar es Salaam Water and Sewerage Authority (DAWASA) is in charge of the city's water supply and distribution. Only 25% of the city's people have access to this water, while the other 75% live in unplanned and unserviced townships. Around 80% of residents in these settlements utilize pit latrines, which are typically poorly constructed and poorly maintained. Pit latrines, which are commonly found in densely populated regions, are prone to flooding during the rainy season due to a lack of drainage systems, particularly in squatter zones. This increases the likelihood of significant health issues. Poor sewerage treatment and solid waste disposal are primarily the result of ineffective council management. 

Mwalimu Nyerere International Airport serves the Ilala Municipal Council as the primary entry point for incoming and outgoing aviation passengers. Tanzania Airport Authority is in charge of the airport.

Public transportation
The major mode of public transportation is the 'daladala' bus.
The majority of them are registered and privately operated daladala in services with a seating capacity of 25-32 people. In Dar es Salaam, public transportation is unreliable, uncomfortable, and dangerous. The maximum daily passenger capacity is predicted to be 4.6 million passenger journeys per day, based on the overall size of the urban transportation fleet.

The city's road networks were planned and built by German and British colonial entities. Prior to WWII, private autos and non-motorized transport (NMT) modes such as walking and cycling dominated urban travel. As Dar es Salaam's population rose, so did the demand for public transportation, particularly among those who lived distant from their places of employment.
Prior to 1992, there had been only minor improvements in city infrastructure. Over a period of more than 15 years, city planning and administration shown their inability to guide urban development. Thirty-three percent of all mobility in the city is done on foot, yet NMT has been overlooked in the broader transportation system, and the requisite facilities to support NMT are sometimes missing. 
City streets, for example, lack walkways, bicycle paths, zebra crossings, footbridges, and pedestrian signs and markings. As a result, those who rely on NMT must share the same space as those who use motorized transportation, resulting in an increase in the number of accidents on city streets.

Population and demographics 
The area that is now Dar es Salaam Region is the ancestral home to the Zaramo people who are the majority ethnic group in the outskirts of the region.  As the region holding the highest population in the country, the region is home to every tribe in the country due to mass migration over the years as well as the largest foreign immigrant population in the country. The region is home to all of the international embassies in the country. The region's city is one of the fastest-growing cities in the world. 
According to the 2012 national census, the Dar es Salaam Region had a population of 4,364,541. With 2,125,786 males (48.7%) and 2,238,755 females (51.3%). The City's population grew from 67,227 in 1948 to 4,364,541 in 2012. (NBS, 2012). Dar es Salaam's population is anticipated to reach 5,586,612 by 2017 with a 5.6 annual population growth rate, rising to 9.7 million by 2030 and 15.6 million by 2050. 
One of the most visible effects of urbanisation is the rising demand for housing. Seventy-five percent of the city's home building occurs on unplanned and unserviced land and is conducted through informal land acquisition. To create low-income housing for the needy, the government collaborates with land development partners such as the National Housing Corporation. As things stand, the construction program funded by the government and the NHC is still prohibitively expensive for low-income residents, fueling the growth of informal settlements.

Districts
Dar es Salaam City Council is led by a mayor and an executive director/city director. Waste Management and Sanitation, Engineering and Fire Services, Urban Planning, Transportation, Environment, Health, and Finance and Administration are all under the control of the city director. Kinondoni, Ilala, and Temeke are the three municipalities/districts within the city government. A District Commissioner oversees each district. The city council is a democratic institution and is in charge of developing the city's strategic framework and drafting city legislation. 

Each municipality is represented by a council, which is led by a Mayor and an Executive Director. The Minister of Regional Administration and Local Government appoints and holds accountable three municipal directors. Ward and subward (Mtaa) leaders, as well as villages (vijiji) and hamlets (vitongoji) in some places, are appointed by and accountable to the Municipal Director at the lowest administrative levels. 

Property taxes, local service levies, advertisement and billboard levies, market fees, grants, donations, government subsidies, and community contributions are among the key sources of funding. The Procurement Act and the Public Finance Management Act provide instructions on the use and reporting of public funds. Previously, financial responsibility was hampered since various regulations applied to different companies and was narrowly focused on expenditure control. 

In the year 2000, the city council decentralized its functions into three municipalities: Kinondoni, Ilala, and Temeke.
Municipalities now have complete policy and legislative implementation authority. Planning and management were done collaboratively. 

Dar es Salaam Region is divided into five administrative districts, four of which are governed by municipal councils that are affiliated with the city's suburbs or wards.

Education and health

Education
As of 2022, there were 987 schools in Dar es Salaam Region, 663 of are primary schools and 324 are secondary schools. The University of Dar es Salaam, the University College of Lands and Architectural Studies, the Open University of Tanzania, the International Medical and Technological University, and the Hubert Kairuki Memorial University in Mikocheni are the city's five universities.

Health
In terms of healthcare facilities, as of 2022 Dar es Salaam Region is home to 4 national hospitals, 38 hospitals, 58 health centers and 436 clinics. Dar es Salaam is served by Lugalo Hospital, Mwananyamala Government Hospital, Mnazi Mmoja Hospital, Amana Hospital, and Muhimbili Referral Hospital. The Health Sector Reform Programme (HSRP) improved public-private collaboration in health-care delivery. Dar es Salaam currently has 24 privately owned and registered laboratories, 489 registered medical stores, 400 registered pharmacies, and over 100 unregistered medical stores and laboratories.

Notable persons from Dar es Salaam Region
 David Adjaye, Ghanian architect
 Said Salim Bakhresa, Tanzanian billionaire
 Bibi Titi Mohammed, Tanzanian founding mother
 Raphael Bocco, Tanzanian footballer
 Betty Boniphace, Tanzanian model
 Abby Chams, Tanzanian artist
 Francis Cheka, Tanzanian boxer
 Yvonne Cherrie, Tanzanian actress
 Chipo Chung,Zimbabwean actress
 Darassa, Tanzanian musician
 Faisal Devji, Tanzanian Islamic historian
 Diamond Platnumz, Tanzanian musician
 Frank Domayo, Tanzanian footballer

Notes

References

External links
 

Districts of Dar es Salaam Region